Wieck can refer to:

Places 

 Wieck, Poland, in Gmina Czersk, Chojnice County, Pomeranian Voivodeship
 Wieck auf dem Darß, Vorpommern, Germany
 Wiekowice, Gmina Darłowo, Sławno County, West Pomeranian Voivodeship, Poland (formerly German Wieck)

People 

 Wieck family of musicians in Germany, including:
 Friedrich Wieck (1785–1873)
 Clara Wieck (1819–1896), pianist, composer, wife of Robert Schumann
 Marie Wieck (1832–1916), pianist
 Agnes Burns Wieck (1892–1966), American labor organizer, journalist
 Brad Wieck (born 1991), American baseball player
 David Wieck, American philosopher, activist
 Hans-Georg Wieck (b.1928) Former German diplomat and president of the German federal intelligence agency Bundesnachrichtendienst
 Michael Wieck (b. 1928), German violinist and author

See also
 Wiek (disambiguation)
 Wick (disambiguation)
Surnames from given names